"Do Right" is a 1980 hit song by Paul Davis from the album Paul Davis. The song was one of several gospel-tinged songs to hit the US pop charts by 1980, peaking at No. 23 on the Hot 100 and No. 4 on the Adult Contemporary chart. The song became the 10th biggest Christian adult contemporary hit of 1980.  The song reached #64 in Canada.

Terry McMillan covered the song in 1997 with a guest performance from Davis. There are also gospel tinged cover versions from Take 6 and 4Him.

References

1981 songs
1981 singles
Bang Records singles
Paul Davis (singer) songs
Song articles with missing songwriters